Kevin Nowlan (born 1958) is an American comics artist who works as a penciler, inker, colorist, and letterer. He has been called "one of the few artists who can be called 'artists's artist'", a master of the various disciplines of comic production, from "design to draftsmanship to dramatics".

Early life
Nowlan was born in 1958 in Nebraska. He has four older brothers and sisters. His brother read comic books, particularly DC Comics titles, and Nowlan has had comics around him since he can remember. As an illustrator, Nowlan is mostly self-taught, but did attend a trade school for approximately a year and a half to learn design and layout.

Career
Nowlan first came to the industry's attention in the early 1980s via illustrations in the fan press, most notably The Comics Journal and Amazing Heroes.

Nowlan's first published work for Marvel Comics was Doctor Strange #57 (Feb. 1983). He has worked for DC Comics and other comics publishers. He contributed to the adult Penthouse Comix.  In 1992, he inked the Batman: Sword of Azrael miniseries which introduced the character Azrael. He drew the short story "The Castle" in Vertigo Jam #1 (Aug. 1993) which featured the Sandman and was part of "The Kindly Ones" story arc. One of Nowlan's prominent contribution to comics is the creation of Jack B. Quick with writer Alan Moore.  This character appeared several times in Tomorrow Stories under the America's Best Comics imprint.

Although the majority of his work is as an inker, he has provided both pencils and lettering for various comics. He is a noted cover illustrator. Nowlan contributed character designs to Batman: The Animated Series, most notably The Penguin, The Mad Hatter and the Man-Bat.

Nowlan has described himself as a "finisher" rather than an inker, although only in specific reference to work "where you see too much of me", and has expressed an ambivalence towards this role, saying "it's not the right way to ink someone else's pencils".

His style gives a strong emphasis towards both facial expression and posture, and in neither case is he constrained by the conventions of the comic-book hero, and his protagonists are often depicted with awkward expressions or body postures. 

Steve Gerber's posthumous Man-Thing story The Screenplay of the Living Dead Man, with art by Nowlan, originally planned as a 1980s graphic novel before being left uncompleted by the artist, was revived in the 2010s and appeared as a three-issue miniseries cover-titled The Infernal Man-Thing (Early Sept.-Oct. 2012). The story was a sequel to Gerber's “Song-Cry of the Living Dead Man” in Man-Thing #12 (Dec. 1974).

Nowlan inked the 1990s variant cover penciled by Dan Jurgens for Action Comics #1000 (June 2018) and inked the "Actionland!" chapter drawn by José Luis García-López in that same issue.

Awards
 Inkwell Award for Favorite Finisher/Embellisher (2008)
 Inkwell Award for The Joe Sinnott Hall of Fame Award (2011)
 Inkpot Award (2015)

Bibliography

Interior work
Doctor Strange (Marvel):
 "Gather My Disciples Before Me!" (with Roger Stern, inks by Terry Austin and colors by Bob Sharen, in vol. 2 #57, 1983)
 "The Coming Slaughter" (with Jason Aaron, co-feature, in vol. 4 #1, 2015)
 "Mistress Miraculous" (with Jason Aaron, among other artists, co-feature, in vol. 4 #6, 2016)
 "The New Face of Magic" (with Jason Aaron and Leonardo Romero, in vol. 4 #11, 2016)
 "The Weird, the Weirder, and the Weirdest" (with Jason Aaron and Chris Bachalo, in vol. 4 #20, 2017)
 "Past and Present" (with John Barber, Juan Manuel Frigeri and colors by Dan Brown, in vol. 4 #25, 2017)
 "The Lever" (with Mark Waid and colors by Jim Campbell, co-feature, in vol. 5 #10, 2019)
Moon Knight (with colors by Christie Scheele, Marvel):
 "Colloquy" (with Steven Grant, co-feature, in #29, 1983)
 "A Box of Music for Savage Studs" (with Doug Moench and inks by Terry Austin, in #31, 1983)
 "When the Music Stops..." (with Doug Moench and inks by Carl Potts, in #32, 1983)
 "Exploding Myths" (with Doug Moench and inks by Carl Potts, Bill Sienkiewicz, Brent Anderson and Joe Chiodo, in #33, 1983)
 "Second Wind" (with Tony Isabella, additional art by Bob McLeod and inks by Carl Potts and Joe Chiodo, in #35, 1984)
Dalgoda #2–6: "Grimwood's Daughter" (with Jan Strnad and colors by Kenneth Smith, anthology, Fantagraphics Books, 1985)
The Outsiders Annual #1: "The Skull... the Serpent... and the Outsiders" (with Mike W. Barr, DC Comics, 1986)
The New Mutants #51: "Teacher's Choice" (with Chris Claremont and colors by Glynis Oliver, Marvel, 1987)
Tales of the Green Lantern Corps Annual #3: "A Sense of Obligation" (with Richard Bruning, co-feature, DC Comics, 1987)
Plastic Man vol. 3 #1–4 ("reality check" framing sequence; with Phil Foglio and Hilary Barta, DC Comics, 1988–1989)
Secret Origins vol. 2 #39: "The Secret Origin of Man-Bat" (with Jan Strnad, anthology, DC Comics, 1989)
A1 #4: "The Hero of the Tale" (with Jan Strnad, anthology, Atomeka, 1990)
Vertigo Jam: "The Castle" (with Neil Gaiman and colors by Daniel Vozzo, anthology one-shot, Vertigo, 1993)
The Big Book of Urban Legends: "Curses! Broiled Again!" (with Jan Harold Brunvand, anthology, Paradox Press, 1994)
Penthouse Comix (anthology, Penthouse):
 "Scion" (with George Caragonne and additional inks by John Nyberg (#3), in #1–4, 1994)
 "Rod in Hell" (with Dave Johnson (as writer and main artist) and colors by Bad @ss, in #29, 1998)
Batman Black and White #4: "Monsters in the Closet" (with Jan Strnad, anthology, DC Comics, 1996)
Aliens: Havoc #1 (with Mark Schultz and colors by Pamela Rambo, among other artists, Dark Horse, 1997)
Gen¹³ vol. 2 #36: "No Good Deed" (with John Arcudi and colors by Laura DePuy, co-feature, Wildstorm, 1998)
Tomorrow Stories (anthology, America's Best Comics):
 "Smalltown Stardom" (with Alan Moore and colors separations by Wildstorm FX, in #1, 1999)
 "The Unbearableness of Being Light" (with Alan Moore and color separations by Ben Dimagmaliw, in #2, 1999)
 "Pet Theory" (with Alan Moore and color separations by Alex Bleyaert, in #3, 1999)
 "A Brief Geography of Time"" (with Alan Moore and colors by Wildstorm FX, in #4, 2000)
 "Jack B. Quick's Amazing World of Science!" (with Alan Moore, in ABC Special one-shot, 2001)
 "Why the Long Face?" (with Alan Moore, in #10, 2001)
 "The Facts of Life!" (with Alan Moore, in #12, 2002)
 "Jack B. Quick" (with Peter Hogan and colors by Michelle Madsen, in ABC: A to Z #1, co-feature, 2005)
 "I, Robert" (with Alan Moore and colors by Michelle Madsen, in Tomorrow Stories Special #1, co-feature, 2006)
Green Lantern/Superman: Legend of the Green Flame: "Chapter Four" (with Neil Gaiman, one-shot, DC Comics, 2000)
9-11 Volume 1: "Untitled" (with an anonymous writer, two pages in anthology graphic novel, Dark Horse, 2002)
52 #13, 20 (with Mark Waid, "Origins" co-features, DC Comics, 2006)
The Goon: Noir #2: "Man of the Hour" (with John Arcudi, anthology, Dark Horse, 2006)
X-Men: First Class Special: "The Museum of Oddities" (with Jeff Parker, co-feature, Marvel, 2007)
Hellboy: Buster Oakley Gets His Wish (with Mike Mignola, one-shot, Dark Horse, 2011)
The Infernal Man-Thing #1–3: "The Screenplay of the Living Dead Man" (with Steve Gerber, Marvel, 2012)
The Graveyard Book (with P. Craig Russell and colors by Lovern Kindzierski, graphic novels, HarperCollins):
 "1: How Nobody Came to the Graveyard" (in Volume 1, 2013)
 "8: Leavings and Partings" (with additional inks by Galen Showman, in Volume 2, 2014)
Lobster Johnson (with Mike Mignola and John Arcudi, one-shots, Dark Horse):
 Satan Smells a Rat (2013)
 A Chain Forged in Life (two pages of framing sequence, 2015)
Abe Sapien #23: "The Ogopogo" (with Scott Allie, Dark Horse, 2015)
Giant-Size X-Men Tribute (after Len Wein and Dave Cockrum, among other artists, one-shot, Marvel, 2020)
Legion of Super-Heroes vol. 7 #9 (with Brian Michael Bendis, among other artists, DC Comics, 2020)

Covers only

As an inker

As a letterer
The Incredible Hulk vol. 2 #301–305 and 308: "Gamma Grams" (logo design for the letters page,  Marvel, 1984–1985)
Moonshadow #1–7 and 9–12 (written by J. M. DeMatteis, drawn by Jon J Muth and Kent Williams, Epic, 1985–1987)
ROM #75: "The End!" (written by Bill Mantlo, drawn by Steve Ditko, Marvel, 1986)
Children of the Night Tide (logo design for the cover, tpb, Fantagraphics Books, 1986)
Steelgrip Starkey #1: "Working Man's Myth!" (written and drawn by Alan Weiss, Epic, 1986)
Flesh and Bones #1–4 (logo design for the covers, anthology, Fantagraphics Books, 1986)
Anything Goes! #1–6 (logo design for the covers, anthology, Fantagraphics Books, 1986–1987)
Vic and Blood: The Chronicles of a Boy and His Dog #1–2  (logo design for the covers, Mad Dog Graphics, 1987)
Epic Graphic Novel: Mœbius 3 — The Airtight Garage (with John Workman, Gaspar Saladino and Phil Felix, Epic, 1987)
Six from Sirius (adjustments to the original lettering of the six-issue mini-series, with Gaspar Saladino, tpb, Epic, 1988)
The Punisher: Intruder and Kingdom Gone (subtitle logo designs for the covers, graphic novels, Marvel, 1989–1990)
Hellboy #1-ongoing (basis for the title logo design, reworked by Mike Mignola, Dark Horse, 1993–...)
Season of the Witch #0–4 (logo design for the covers, Image, 2005–2006)

Notes

References

External links

Official blog
Gallery of published and unpublished works
Kevin Nowlan at Mike's Amazing World of Comics
Kevin Nowlan at the Unofficial Handbook of Marvel Comics Creators

1958 births
20th-century American artists
21st-century American artists
American comics artists
Artists from Nebraska
Comic book letterers
Comics colorists
Comics inkers
DC Comics people
Eisner Award winners for Best Penciller/Inker or Penciller/Inker Team
Inkpot Award winners
Living people
Marvel Comics people